Master of Disguise may refer to:

 The Master of Disguise, a 2002 American adventure comedy film
 The Master of Disguise (novel), a novel in the Jedi Quest series by Jude Watson
 Master of Disguise (Savage Grace album), 1985
 Master of Disguise (Lizzy Borden album), 1989
 Wario: Master of Disguise, a 2007 platform game
 Master of Disguise: My Secret Life in the CIA, a 1999 non-fiction memoir by Tony Mendez